The Inter-Provincial Cup is a limited-overs cricket tournament in Ireland between the four leading cricketing provinces of Ireland. The tournament was held for the first time in 2013 across venues in both Northern Ireland and the Republic of Ireland. Up to and including the 2016 tournament, the matches were not given List A status. However, at an International Cricket Council (ICC) meeting in October 2016, List A status was awarded to all future matches.

History

Background
The Ireland cricket team have had huge success recently on the international level which has boosted the popularity of the game in the country. They had earned the reputation of a giant killer after upsetting teams like Pakistan and Bangladesh (2007 Cricket World Cup), and England (2011 Cricket World Cup). Their good performances in major international tournaments meant that Cricket Ireland openly started bidding for Test match status to the International Cricket Council. Nevertheless, one of the main stumbling road blocks for Ireland from getting to play the pinnacle of the game was a lack of a first-class cricket infrastructure at home, among other things. As early as August 2011, Cricket Ireland announced plans of a domestic first-class tournament. In January 2012, Cricket Ireland announced the ambitious 'Vision 2020' plan which announced the establishment of a first-class structure by 2015 and achievement of Test status by 2020. It also began work on a cricket academy to find talented players across the country and improving grass-roots cricket in the country. For the first time professional contacts, with central, A, B, and C were established. Plans for Test status were established partly to stem the flow of their star cricketers moving away to England in hope of playing Test cricket such as Ed Joyce, Eoin Morgan and Boyd Rankin. According to Richard Holdsworth in an interview with Setanta Sports, CI are pleased with the strategic progress that had been made as of November 2012. In December 2012, Ireland got a $1.5m boost as increased funding from the ICC to establish elite domestic competitions in the country.

Format
The tournament is played in a double round-robin format, with each team playing each other twice, once at home and once away.

Points summary
Points are scored as follows:

 Win – 4 points
 Tie or no result – 2 points
 Loss – 0 points
 Bonus point – 1 point awarded to a team winning a match with a run rate equal to 1.25 times that of the losing team

Teams
According to Richard Holdsworth's interview to Setanta Sports, three teams would initially participate in the tournament, Leinster cricket team, Northern cricket team and North West cricket team as Munster and Connacht were considered still quite far away from fielding a competitive team for provincial tournaments. They were also given a separate limited overs names much similar to the systems in England and Australia, i.e., like Nottinghamshire Outlaws and South Australia Redbacks. In this case, the names are Leinster Lightning, Northern Knights and North West Warriors.

From the 2021 season Munster Reds joined the Inter Provincial Cup having previously only competed in the Twenty20 Inter-Provincial Trophy

Competition placings

2013 to present

All-time records
(All records correct to end of 2014 season)

Team records

Highest innings totals

Lowest completed innings totals

Individual records – batting

Most career runs

Highest individual scores

Most runs scored in a season

Individual records – bowling

Most career wickets

Best bowling in an innings

Most wickets in a season

Partnership records

Highest partnerships for each wicket

Seasons
2013 Inter-Provincial Cup
2014 Inter-Provincial Cup

See also

Cricket in Ireland
History of cricket
Inter-Provincial Championship
Inter-Provincial Trophy

References

External links
-official website

 
Irish domestic cricket competitions
List A cricket competitions